Azilia eryngioides is a species of flowering plant in the family Apiaceae, endemic to Iran. It is the only species in the genus Azilia.

References 

Endemic flora of Iran
Apioideae
Plants described in 1918